La Confrérie de la Chaîne des Rôtisseurs is an international gastronomic society founded in Paris in 1950. The Chaîne is based on the traditions and practices of the old French Royal Guild of Goose Roasters, whose authority gradually expanded to the roasting of all poultry, meat, and game. It is dedicated to the culinary arts, promoting and developing their gastronomic values while at the same time widening its focus to table art.

History
The written history of the guild of "Les Oyers" or "Goose Roasters" has been traced back to 1248. At that time, King Louis IX assigned Étienne Boileau, the Provost of Paris, with the task of bringing order into the organization of trades and guilds, developing young apprentices and improving the technical knowledge of guild members. He gathered the charters of more than 100 of these trades, among them the Goose Roasters.

Over the years, the activities and privileges of the Goose Roasters Guild were extended to preparing and selling all kinds of meat, including poultry and venison.

In 1509, during the reign of King Louis XII, some new statutes were introduced, which resulted in the change of the name of the guild to "Rôtisseurs" and the restriction of its activities to poultry, game birds, lamb and venison. In 1610, under King Louis XIII, the guild was granted a royal charter and its own coat of arms.

For over four centuries, the "Confrérie", or brotherhood of the Roasters, cultivated and developed culinary art and high standards of professionalism and quality—standards befitting the splendor of the "Royal Table"—until the guild system was disbanded in 1793 during the French Revolution. The Rôtisseurs were almost forgotten until 1950, when Auguste Becart, Jean Valby, Curnonsky, Louis Giraudon, and Marcel Dorin borrowed the guild's name to create La Confrérie de la Chaîne des Rôtisseurs.

The Chaîne today
Since its recreation in 1950, the society has grown dramatically, spreading its influence and presence worldwide. Today, the Chaîne brings together professional and non-professional members from around the world who share in the "spirit" of the Society and who appreciate and enjoy wine and fine dining. While a confrérie is a "brotherhood," women have always been welcome, and they take an active role in the Society. Within the Chaîne, there is also the "L'Ordre Mondial des Gourmets Dégustateurs" for those members who have special knowledge of, or interest in, wine and spirits.

The international headquarters (Siège Mondial) remains in Paris where the society was founded, and the present day Chaîne des Rôtisseurs is still based on the traditions and practices of the ancient French brotherhood but now in an international and contemporary context.

The organization has 20000 members in 73 countries. The national chapters are called bailliages and often have regional subsections.

A small group of representatives from the Confrérie were guest judges on Season 3 Episode 4 of the TV Show Top Chef.

Jeunes Chefs Rôtisseurs competition
La Chaîne des Rôtisseurs organizes a cooking competition for young chefs under 27, sponsored by a professional Chaîne member. The purpose of this competition is to encourage and promote the culinary expertise of young chefs in the tradition of the Chaîne des Rôtisseurs by exposing them to a competitive environment with their peers. This competition offers the opportunity for the Jeunes Chefs to showcase their talents and creativity in an international arena. The competition's goal is to encourage cultural differences in food presentation and preparation using a traditional approach.

The competition is a "black box" competition, where the competitor does not know the ingredients he is to cook with until he arrives at the competition. He then has 30 minutes to write a menu and three and a half hours to prepare a three-course dinner for four people.

Competition
The Jeunes Chefs Competition was first organized in 1977 in Switzerland to support and promote future young chefs by allowing them to demonstrate their skills. Competitions are held at regional, national and international levels in countries worldwide.

Competition begins at the regional level. Proprietors, managers, chefs and culinary instructors at Chaîne affiliated restaurants, hotels and culinary schools. Contestants are then selected from the group of applicants.

At the appointed time, each contestant is given an identical, previously unidentified "black box" containing certain basic ingredients. Using these ingredients, some mandatory and some non-mandatory as well as drawing on various staples from a pantry, the contestant must compose and execute a 3-course menu (first course, main course, and dessert) for four people. The written menu must be completed within the first half-hour, with 3½ hours allowed for preparation, after which the finished dishes are presented to be judged within a 45-minute window.

Judging
Experienced culinary professionals who are Chaîne members are selected to serve as judges. A candidate's sponsor may not serve as a judge. To ensure complete secrecy and objectivity, contestants are identified by number only rather than by name.

Dishes prepared by the contestants are judged on taste, presentation and originality. In addition, scores are given for cleanliness and organization in the kitchen.

Eligibility
The competition is open to young cooks under the age of 27 on September 1 of the year of the international competition, which a professional Chaine member sponsors. Once accepted, a candidate must furnish proof of age.

A candidate must be nominated by their employer, who must be a member of the Chaine des Rôtisseurs and accepted by the Competition Committee. Participating in the Competition at any level imposes upon the competitor the acceptance and respect of the rules.

Winners of past Chaine international Jeunes Chefs Competitions are not eligible to compete. Past contestants (non-winners) may compete nationally for a second time as long as they are eligible under the age and experience ruling.

Competition levels
The first-place winners of all Regional Competitions are qualified to participate in their country's National Final. The winner of the national final will compete in the International Competition.

Coat of arms
The original coat of arms consists of two crossed turning spits and four larding needles, surrounded by flames of the hearth on a shield.

For the new Confrérie, a logo was created, which used the former historic shield in the center. It was encircled with fleur-de-lis and two chains, between which the new name of the Society and the foundation dates of 1248 and 1950 were written.

The inner chain represents the professional members; the outer chain is the non-professional members and the bond which unites all members.

Ribbons 
All members are given ribbons appropriate to their rank and career, whether a hospitality professional or a gastronome.  Ribbons with orange denote members who are in the hospitality field.  Green, blue, maroon and red ribbons indicate officers of the Chaine, either on a local, national, or international level.  Members can be promoted within la Chaine, and their ribbons will change at that time.

All ribbons are presented at an induction ceremony.

External links
 Official website of the international headquarters of the Chaîne des Rôtisseurs
 Official website of the Jeunes Chefs Rôtisseurs and Jeunes Sommeliers International Competitions

All national websites are listed on the international website.

French cuisine
Gastronomical societies
Confraternities
Organizations established in 1950
1950 establishments in France